Frank Murcott Bladen (1858-1912) was an English-born Australian librarian and historian.

Notable works
Historical records of New South Wales

See also 

 Australian Joint Copying Project
State Library of New South Wales

References

1858 births
1912 deaths
English emigrants to colonial Australia
Australian librarians
19th-century Australian public servants